Thysanomeros is a genus of leaf beetles in the subfamily Eumolpinae. It is found in Costa Rica. The generic name is derived from the Greek thysano ("brush") and meros ("femur").

Species
 Thysanomeros jacobyi (Lefèvre, 1885)
 Thysanomeros ulateae Flowers, 2003

References

Eumolpinae
Chrysomelidae genera
Beetles of Central America